Pawan Kumar Sharma is an Indian politician and a member of the Sixth Legislative Assembly of Delhi in India. He represents the Adarsh Nagar constituency of Delhi and is a member of the Aam Aadmi Party political party.

Early life and education
Pawan Kumar Sharma was born in Hisar district. He is educated till twelfth grade degree.

Political career
Pawan Kumar Sharma has been a MLA. He represented the Adarsh Nagar constituency and is a member of the Aam Aadmi Party political party.

Member of the Legislative Assembly
He represents Adarsh Nagar (Delhi Assembly constituency) in the Delhi Legislative Assembly. In 2015 he was elected to the Sixth Legislative Assembly of Delhi. In 2020 he was elected to the Seventh Legislative Assembly of Delhi.

Electoral performance

See also
 Aam Aadmi Party
 
 Politics of India
 Sixth Legislative Assembly of Delhi

References 

1970 births
Delhi MLAs 2015–2020
Delhi MLAs 2020–2025
Living people
People from Delhi
People from New Delhi
Aam Aadmi Party MLAs from Delhi